"Shame" is a song by all-female German pop group Monrose, recorded for the band's debut studio album, Temptation (2006). It was written by Christian Ballard, Tim Hawes, Pete Kirtley and Andrew Murray, while joint production was helmed by British production teams Jiant and Snowflakers. Set against a heavy drum pattern and computerized synths sounds, "Shame" is a piano ballad arranged as a mid-tempo with pop and R&B influences. The song's lyrics are about the breakdown of a relationship with a man, with the protagonist blaming her own mistakes, including her ongoing call for independence, for their separation.

The song was released as the band's debut single on 1 December 2006 in German-speaking Europe, following the trio's formation on the fifth series finale of the reality talent contest Popstars two weeks prior. A "smash hit", it debuted and peaked at number one in Austria, Germany and Switzerland, where it became one of the best-selling singles of the year, resulting in a sales total of 200,000 copies Europe-wide, and the most-downloaded track since the introduction of the legal digital download charts in Germany in 2004. "Shame" also reached the top ten on the official airplay charts in the Czech Republic and Slovenia, and on a composite European Hot 100 Singles chart respectively.

Release
"Shame" worldpremiered on 16 November 2006 on the second-last episode of the Popstars series in a special solo version performed by Bahar Kızıl. Even though the song was not advertised as the final group's first single at this point, Amazon.de accidentally released a CD cover – which showed three (Katarzyna Zinkiewicz, Mandy Capristo and Bahar Kızıl) of the six remaining finalists – the day after. While the accident raised public concern about the significance of the final band voting, the cover soon was replaced by promotional artwork and Popstars broadcaster ProSieben instantly released an official statement which confirmed both the single's title and the planned band name Monrose but also rejected reproaches of fraud.

However, on the season's finale on Thursday 23 November 2006, three different variants were presented in several constellations, ending with a final version of "Shame" sung by all three Monrose members in place. In the following days, various audio rips of the show spread, but it was not until 30 November 2006 that the radio edit leaked onto the internet.

Music video 

The music video for "Shame" was directed by Oliver Sommer and filmed inside the Berlin Ballhaus Studios in the week of 30 October 2006. Produced by AVA Studios GmbH, it was shot over 24 hours and choreographed by Popstars judge Detlef Soost. A one-and-a-half-minute preview of the edited music video was aired on 24 November 2006 on ProSieben's tabloid news magazine Taff, while the full-length version was eventually premiered the same day at the end of VIVA's show Neu. As reported, 20 different versions of the video with all six finalists of the show were produced since the jury had not laid down who would make the band at this time.

The video begins with Bahar Kızıl waking up in her bedroom after an argument with her boyfriend the night before. She enters the bathroom, where she is confronted and churned up with his dental equipmenta and eventually dresses up. Her sequences are intercutted by Senna Gammour and Mandy Capristo who alternately switch into her role. The video ends with a young man entering the kitchen, apologizing to an impressed Capristo with a bunch of flowers.

Chart performance 
Although "Shame" was officially released on 1 December 2006, it appeared a week early on the German Airplay Chart, debuting at number 66, according to Nielsen Music Control. However, it took another five weeks until the song reached the top position on the particular chart, eventually becoming the first airplay number-one of 2007.

With a total of more than 150,000 CD maxi singles shipped to stores within its first week of release, the song also debuted on top of the German Top 100 singles chart, making Monrose one of the most successful musical debuts of the year. Outselling 3/4 of the German Top 100's singles sales combined, the song, moreover, emerged as the fastest selling CD single of 2006 and the biggest downloaded song since the introduction of the legal digital download charts in 2004. Although "Shame" spend two weeks on top of the charts only, it profited from constant sales and as a result remained on the charts until late March 2007, staying 17 weeks on that particular chart. The song was eventually certified triple gold and one-time platinum by the German arm of the International Federation of the Phonographic Industry, and ranked seventh on the German Media Control singles year-end charts 2007.

In Austria and Switzerland, the single also spent two weeks on top of the national singles charts, while remaining within the top 100 until mid-April 2007 – one month after the release of follow-up "Even Heaven Cries". It was eventually certified gold by the IFPI Austria for more than 15,000 singles sold in its first week of release and ranked 16th on the Swiss singles year-end charts. Outside the German-speaking countries, "Shame" reached the top ten of the Slovenian Airplay Chart and a peak position of number 47 on the Czech Airplay Chart.

Formats and track listings

Credits and personnel

Vocals: M. Capristo, S. Guemmour, B. Kızıl
Writers: Christian Ballard, Tim Hawes, Pete Kirtley, Andrew Murray
Producers: Jiant/Snowflake
All instruments: C. Ballard, T. Hawes, P. Kirtley, A. Murray

Mixing: C. Ballard, Ren Swan
Additional mixing: JEO
Recorded at Werytin Studios, Munich
Artwork: Claudia Macias

Charts

Weekly charts

Year-end charts

Certifications

References

External links
 
 

2006 debut singles
Monrose songs
Number-one singles in Austria
Number-one singles in Germany
Number-one singles in Switzerland
Songs written by Pete Kirtley
Songs written by Tim Hawes
Songs written by Christian Ballard (songwriter)
2006 songs
Music videos directed by Oliver Sommer
2006 singles